The Canora station is a railway station in Canora, Saskatchewan, Canada. The station is served by Via Rail's Winnipeg – Churchill train twice per week in each direction.

The station houses the Canora Station House Museum and is the oldest Class II railway station still in operation in Saskatchewan.
The town of Canora itself is named for the first 2 letters in CAnadian NOrthern RAilway.

Footnotes

External links 
Via Rail Station Information
Canora Station House Museum - Town of Canora

Via Rail stations in Saskatchewan
Good Lake No. 274, Saskatchewan
Canora, Saskatchewan
Railway museums in Saskatchewan